R. Hanoch ben Moses (Hebrew: רבנו חנוך ב"ר משה) (died 1014 CE or 1024 CE) was a Spanish rabbi. Almost all of the information we have about him comes from the Sefer ha-Qabbalah by R. Abraham ibn Daud.

Along with his parents, R. Moses ben Hanoch and his wife (name unknown), R. Hanoch was captured by the Moorish pirate Ibn Rumahis and brought to Cordova. R. Hanoch eventually succeeded his father as rabbi and Rosh Yeshivah there, although for a time he faced opposition by R. Joseph ibn Abitur and by the latter's patron, Yaakov ibn Jau, the lay leader of the Jewish community of the Caliphate of Cordoba. So highly respected was R. Hanoch by everyone that even his bitter adversary Ibn Abitur (who has been exiled because of the ban issued by R. Hanoch on the latter) couldn't help but express his admiration for him, "I bring the heavens and earth as my witnesses that there is none equal to R. Hanoch, from Spain to the academies of Babylon."

His best-known student was R. Shmuel ha-Nagid.

Ibn Daud reports that relations between R. Hanoch and R. Hai Gaon were strained since the increasing stature of the Spanish yeshivot led to a lessening of their communities' financial contributions to the Talmudic Academies in Babylonia. Indeed, R. Hanoch seems to have corresponded only rarely with the Babylonian Geonim. However, R. Hai demonstrated his respect for R. Hanoch, by honoring his excommunion of Ibn Abitur and refusing the latter an audience.

R. Hanoch left no written works, although there are some extant responsa between him and Rav Hai Gaon, as well as between him and the then-Gaon in the Land of Israel, Rav Shmuel ha-Kohen.

He died of injuries following a fall when the bimah in the Cordova synagogue collapsed on Simchat Torah. Ibn Daud dates this incident to 4775 (1014 CE) but also states that it was thirteen years before the death of Rav Hai Gaon in 4798, so the correct reading should be 4785 (1024 CE).

References

11th-century rabbis in al-Andalus
11th-century deaths
Year of birth unknown
Year of death uncertain
Rabbis from Córdoba, Spain
Accidental deaths from falls